
This is a list of the 38 players who earned 1998 PGA Tour cards through the PGA Tour Qualifying Tournament in 1997.

 PGA Tour rookie in 1998

1998 Results

*PGA Tour rookie in 1998
T = Tied
 The player retained his PGA Tour card for 1999 (finished inside the top 125)
 The player did not retain his PGA Tour card for 1999, but retained conditional status (finished between 126-150)
 The player did not retain his PGA Tour card for 1999 (finished outside the top 150)

Winners on the PGA Tour in 1998

Runners-up on the PGA Tour in 1998

See also
1997 Nike Tour graduates

References

PGA Tour Qualifying School
PGA Tour Qualifying School Graduates
PGA Tour Qualifying School Graduates